Little Rock Pond may refer to:

 Little Rock Pond (Big Moose, New York)
 Little Rock Pond (Beaver River, New York)

See also
 Little Rocky Pond (Massachusetts)